Cédric Regnier-Lafforgue (born 16 February 1977) is a French freestyle skier. He competed in the men's moguls event at the 2002 Winter Olympics.

References

External links
 

1977 births
Living people
French male freestyle skiers
Olympic freestyle skiers of France
Freestyle skiers at the 2002 Winter Olympics
Sportspeople from Chambéry